Raphitoma griseomaculata is a species of sea snail, a marine gastropod mollusk in the family Raphitomidae.

Description
The length of the holotype reaches 13.9 mm. Its diameter is 5.5 mm.

Distribution
This marine species occurs in the Mediterranean Sea off Lecce, Italy

References

External links
 Giannuzzi-Savelli R., Pusateri F. & Bartolini S. (2018). A revision of the Mediterranean Raphitomidae (Gastropoda, Conoidea), 7: on the sibling species Raphitoma densa (Monterosato, 1884) and R. griseomaculata n. sp. Biodiversity Journal. 9(4): 429-440

griseomaculata
Gastropods described in 2018